Muramoyltetrapeptide carboxypeptidase (carboxypeptidase IIW, carboxypeptidase II, lysyl-D-alanine carboxypeptidase, L-lysyl-D-alanine carboxypeptidase, LD-carboxypeptidase) is an enzyme. This enzyme catalyses the following chemical reaction

 Hydrolysis of the bond: N-acetyl-D-glucosaminyl-N-acetylmuramoyl-L-Ala-D-glutamyl-6-carboxy-L-lysyl--D-alanine

Variants are known from various microorganisms.

References

External links 
 

EC 3.4.17